Ryan Carlos Santos de Sousa (born 14 May 2002), known as Ryan Carlos or just Ryan, is a Brazilian professional footballer who plays as a left back for Bahia.

Club career
Born in Diadema, São Paulo, Ryan represented São Paulo and Ponte Preta as a youth before joining Bahia's under-20 team in September 2020. Promoted to the first team ahead of the 2023 season, he made his senior debut on 11 January of that year, coming on as a second-half substitute for fellow youth graduate Matheus Bahia in a 3–1 Campeonato Baiano home win over Juazeirense.

Career statistics

References

2002 births
Living people
Footballers from São Paulo (state)
Brazilian footballers
Association football defenders
Esporte Clube Bahia players
People from Diadema